Greg Reitman (born May 10, 1971) is an activist filmmaker, author, and professional speaker. He is the founder of Blue Water Entertainment, Inc., an independent production company based in Santa Monica, that produces feature films and documentaries.

Career
Reitman directed, wrote and produced Hollywood's Magical Island: Catalina, syndicated on American Public Television (APT), and traveled the festival circuit. His production company, Blue Water Entertainment, which specialises in films on the environment, produced Fields of Fuel, subsequently renamed Fuel, a feature documentary film on alternative energy with author Josh Tickell. Fields of Fuel premiered at the 2008 Sundance Film Festival, where it won the 2008 Audience Award.  Reitman's latest production project is a feature documentary entitled Rooted in Peace, released in 2014.

Education
Reitman earned his Bachelor of Arts from University of Massachusetts Amherst (1993) and holds a certificate in Film & Television, Marketing & Distribution from UCLA. He received a master certificate in Creative Producing from Tel Aviv University, and has studied at Hokkaido University in Japan and the University of Florence in Italy.

Personal life
Reitman practices Transcendental Meditation.

Bibliography
 Hollywood Isle: Catalina Island Picture Book (2003, Post Card USA)

References

External links
 
  Blue Water Entertainment
 

American environmentalists
American documentary filmmakers
Living people
University of Massachusetts Amherst alumni
UCLA Film School alumni
Tel Aviv University alumni
Hokkaido University alumni
University of Florence alumni
1971 births